Liina Vahtrik (née Liina Sallo; born 8 August 1972 in Tallinn) is an Estonian actress.

Liina Vahtrik was born in Tallinn to actress and singer Helgi Sallo and opera singer Uno Heinapuu (:et). She attended schools in Tallinn, graduating from Tallinn Secondary School no. 47, before enrolling  at the drama department of the Estonian Academy of Music and Theatre in 1994, graduating in 1998.

After graduation from the Estonian Academy of Music and Theatre, in 1998 Vahtrik began an engagement as an actress at the Von Krahl Theatre in Tallinn. She left the Von Krahl Theatre in 2008, became a freelance actress and has appeared in a number of films and television series .

Liina Vahtrik has been married to   since 2023.

Selected filmography
 2006 – Tabamata ime (role: Eeva Marland/Pedak)
 2007 – Jan Uuspõld läheb Tartusse (role: Rahvusema)
 2007-2011 – Kodu keset linna (role: Sirje Koristaja) 
 2009 – Disko ja tuumasõda (role: Narrator)
 2009 – Idioot (role: Varja)
 2016 – Päevad, mis ajasid segadusse (role: Maarika)
 2016-2018 – Naabriplika (role: Krista Koosar)
 2018 – Seltsimees laps (role: Aunt Anne)
 2018 – Lõbus perekond (role: Neighbour)
 2019 – Lahutus Eesti moodi (role: Laura)
 2021 – Vahingu päevaraamat

References

Living people
1972 births
Estonian stage actresses
Estonian film actresses
Estonian television actresses
21st-century Estonian actresses
Estonian Academy of Music and Theatre alumni
Actresses from Tallinn